Todd Woodbridge and Mark Woodforde were the defending champions, but lost in quarterfinals to Bob Bryan and Mike Bryan.

Jan-Michael Gambill and Scott Humphries won the title by defeating Lucas Arnold Ker and Eric Taino 6–1, 6–4 in the final.

Seeds

Draw

Draw

External links
 Official results archive (ATP)
 Official results archive (ITF)

SAP Open
2000 ATP Tour